Øvre Djuptjønnuten is a mountain in the municipality of Bykle in Agder county, Norway. It sits south of the lake Store Urevatn and southeast of the mountain Urevassnutene. The lake Botsvatn and mountain Strondefjell both lie straight south of Øvre Djuptjønnuten.

See also
List of mountains of Norway

References

Mountains of Agder
Bykle